Hank Bjorklund is a retired professional American football player who played running back from 1972 to 1974 for the New York Jets.

References

1950 births
American football running backs
New York Jets players
Princeton Tigers football players
Living people
People from Glen Head, New York
Players of American football from New York (state)